A sand wasp is a wasp of one of the following groups:

 Ammophila, a narrow-waisted genus of hunting wasps that often nests in sandy soil
 Bembicini, a tribe of crabronid wasps that burrow in sandy soil